is a former Japanese football player.

Playing career
Taira was born in Hanamaki on July 16, 1970. After graduating from Juntendo University, he joined Regional Leagues club Tohoku Electric Power (later Brummell Sendai, Vegalta Sendai) in 1993. He played many matches as forward and the club was promoted to Japan Football League from 1995. Although his opportunity to play decreased for injuries, he became a regular player from 1998 and the club was promoted to J2 League from 1999. From 2000, he played for his local club Morioka Zebra (2000–03) and Nippon Steel Kamaishi (2004) in Regional Leagues. He retired end of 2004 season.

Club statistics

References

External links

1970 births
Living people
Juntendo University alumni
People from Hanamaki, Iwate
Association football people from Iwate Prefecture
Japanese footballers
J2 League players
Japan Football League (1992–1998) players
Vegalta Sendai players
Association football forwards